Kinský Palace may refer to:

Kinský Palace (Prague), Czech Republic
Palais Kinsky, Vienna, Austria